Donna Yates is an archaeologist and Associate Professor in the Department of Criminal Law and Criminology at Maastricht University. Her research considers transnational illicit trade in cultural objects, art and heritage crime including Looted art and the Antiquities trade, and white collar crime.

Early life and education 
Yates holds a Bachelor's degree in Archaeology from Boston University, and an M.Phil. and Ph.D. in Archaeology from the University of Cambridge. Her MPhil thesis documented the sale of looted  South American antiquities in auctions in the United States, and her dissertation covered the sociology of  archaeology and heritage in Bolivia.

Research and career 
Her interest in illicit antiquities began in 2003, when she saw a Maya civilization archeological site that had been looted. She has been quoted in numerous reports on Cultural heritage issues, including in the New York Times, Washington Post, and The Economist. After earning her doctoral degree, Yates joined the Scottish Centre for Crime and Justice Research at the University of Glasgow.

From 2012 to 2015, Yates held a Leverhulme Trust Early Career Fellowship and a Core Fulbright Award to study the trafficking of Latin American antiquities. Her grant project used fieldwork in Bolivia, Belize, and Mexico to analyze relationships between communities, governments, the law, and transnational criminal organizations to study the effectiveness of regulatory mechanisms for controlling the illicit antiquities trade.

In 2018, Yates was awarded a 5 year, €1.5 million European Research Council grant to study “criminogenic collectables”: objects that seem inspire criminal behavior by those collecting them, specifically, cultural objects, fossils, and collectable rare wildlife. She moved to Maastricht University where she was made Associate Professor of Archaeology.

Her more recent book, with Cara Tremain, is an edited collection of essays:The Market for Mesoamerica: Reflections on the Sale of Pre-Columbian Antiquities. Gainesville: University Press of Florida (2019).

Yates has created a number of digital projects related to the illicit traffic in cultural goods:

 Trafficking Culture: "a research consortium that produces evidence-based research into the contemporary global trade in looted cultural objects."
 Property of an Anonymous Swiss Collector: a blog about "antiquities theft, art crime, and the complexities of cultural objects."
 Culture Crime News: "a growing database of antiquities and art crime articles from the popular press."
 Stolen Gods: a blog reporting on "the theft and destruction of sacred art from around the world."

Bibliography

References 

Alumni of the University of Cambridge
Academic staff of Maastricht University
Boston University alumni
American criminologists
American women criminologists
Year of birth missing (living people)
Living people